Samalkha Assembly constituency is one of the 90 Haryana Legislative Assembly constituencies in India. It is part of Panipat district.

Members of the Legislative Assembly

Election results

2019

See also
 List of constituencies of the Haryana Legislative Assembly
 Panipat district

References

Panipat district
Assembly constituencies of Haryana